1947 legislative elections may refer to:
 1947 Gambian legislative election
 1947 Polish legislative election
 1947 Sri Lankan legislative election